
<onlyinclude> 
This is a list of the Sites of Special Scientific Interest (SSSIs) in the former county of Avon, England, United Kingdom. In England the body responsible for designating SSSIs is Natural England, which chooses a site because of its fauna, flora, geological or physiographical features. Although the county of Avon no longer exists, Natural England still uses its former borders to mark one of its Areas of Search. As of 2006, there are 86 sites designated in this Area of Search, of which 38 have been designated due to their biological interest, 39 due to their geological interest, and 9 for both.

Natural England took over the role of designating and managing SSSIs from English Nature in October 2006 when it was formed from the amalgamation of English Nature, parts of the Countryside Agency and the Rural Development Service. The English counties were revised under the 1974 reorganisation of local government. Until the 2010s, Natural England, which maintains the database of English SSSIs, kept the listing of counties as it was in 1974, but by 2015 they had updated their lists to reflect some later changes. However, even though Avon was abolished in 1996 it is still used as an area of search by Natural England, rather than being divided between the Gloucestershire and Somerset lists.

The data in the table is taken from English Nature in the form of citation sheets for each SSSI.

For other counties, see List of SSSIs by Area of Search.

Sites

Notes
Data rounded to one decimal place.
Grid reference is based on the British national grid reference system, also known as OSGB36, and is the system used by the Ordnance Survey.
Link to maps using the Nature on the Map service provided by Natural England.
Size smaller than can be shown with one decimal place. Actual size: 0.006 (ha.) 0.015 (ac.).
Incorporates two former SSSIs: Severn Estuary (notified 1976) and part of Brean Down and Uphill Cliff (notified 1952). It was unified as Severn Estuary in 1989. It also overlaps with several other SSSIs:
Avon: Spring Cove Cliffs, Middle Hope, Portishead Pier to Black Nore and Aust Cliff.
Gloucestershire: Purton Passage
Somerset: Brean Down
South Glamorgan: Penarth Coast
The Severn Estuary extends into two other counties and so can be found on lists of SSSIs in Gloucestershire and Somerset.
The Long Dole Wood and Meadows site extends into the county of Somerset and so can be found on the list of SSSIs in Somerset.

References

 
Avon
Avon (county)